In topology, a branch of mathematics, a first-countable space is a topological space satisfying the "first axiom of countability". Specifically, a space  is said to be first-countable if each point has a countable neighbourhood basis (local base). That is, for each point  in  there exists a sequence  of neighbourhoods of  such that for any neighbourhood  of  there exists an integer  with  contained in 
Since every neighborhood of any point contains an open neighborhood of that point, the neighbourhood basis can be chosen without loss of generality to consist of open neighborhoods.

Examples and counterexamples 

The majority of 'everyday' spaces in mathematics are first-countable. In particular, every metric space is first-countable.

An example of a space which is not first-countable is the cofinite topology on an uncountable set (such as the real line).

Another counterexample is the ordinal space  where  is the first uncountable ordinal number. The element  is a limit point of the subset  even though no sequence of elements in  has the element  as its limit. In particular, the point  in the space  does not have a countable local base. Since  is the only such point, however, the subspace  is first-countable.

The quotient space  where the natural numbers on the real line are identified as a single point is not first countable. However, this space has the property that for any subset  and every element  in the closure of  there is a sequence in A converging to  A space with this sequence property is sometimes called a Fréchet–Urysohn space.

First-countability is strictly weaker than second-countability. Every second-countable space is first-countable, but any uncountable discrete space is first-countable but not second-countable.

Properties 

This has consequences for limits and continuity. In particular, if  is a function on a first-countable space, then  has a limit  at the point  if and only if for every sequence  where  for all  we have  Also, if  is a function on a first-countable space, then  is continuous if and only if whenever  then 

In first-countable spaces, sequential compactness and countable compactness are equivalent properties. However, there exist examples of sequentially compact, first-countable spaces which are not compact (these are necessarily not metrizable spaces).  One such space is the ordinal space  Every first-countable space is compactly generated.

Every subspace of a first-countable space is first-countable. Any countable product of a first-countable space is first-countable, although uncountable products need not be.

See also

References

Bibliography 

 
 

General topology
Properties of topological spaces